Nikola Mektić and Mate Pavić defeated Nathaniel Lammons and Jackson Withrow in the final,  6–4, 6–7(5–7), [10–6] to win the men's doubles tennis title at the 2023 ASB Classic.

Luke Bambridge and Ben McLachlan were the reigning champions from 2020, when the event was last held, but Bambridge had since retired from professional tennis and McLachlan chose to compete in Adelaide instead.

Seeds

Draw

Draw

References

External links
 Main draw

ASB Classic - Men's Doubles
2023 Doubles
ASB